Krupps may refer to:

 the Krupps, a German industrial dynasty
 Die Krupps, a German band
 Krups, a German kitchen appliance manufacturer

See also
 Krupp (disambiguation)